Yezhovka is a rural locality (a selo) in Oktyabrsky Selsoviet, Blagoveshchensky District, Bashkortostan, Russia. The population was 84 as of 2010. There are 4 streets.

Geography 
Yezhovka is located 73 km northeast of Blagoveshchensk (the district's administrative centre) by road. Usabash is the nearest rural locality.

References 

Rural localities in Blagoveshchensky District